The 3. divisjon is the fourth highest association football league for men in Norway. In the 1992 season of the 3. divisjon, 22 games were played in 19 groups, with 3 points given for wins and 1 for draws. All group winners were promoted to the 2. divisjon.

Tables 

Group 1
Selbak – promoted
Østsiden
Borgen
Lisleby
Skjetten
Rælingen
Kvik Halden
Torp
Gjelleråsen
Abildsø – relegated
Bøler – relegated
Fet – relegated

Group 2
Galterud – promoted
Høland
Aurskog-Finstadbru
Bjørkelangen
Eidskog
Askim
Greåker
Tune
Rakkestad
Gran
Kongsvinger 2 – relegated
Rapid – relegated

Group 3
Lyn 2 – promoted
Raufoss
Gjøvik-Lyn
Lom
Nordre Land
Sel
Nordstrand
Bygdø
Gjøvik Sport – relegated
Skreia
Hosle – relegated
Vestli – relegated

Group 4
Eidsvold Turn – promoted
Holter
Ham-Kam 2
Lillehammer FK
Vang
Brumunddal
Stange
Nes
Moelven
Trysil – relegated
Vind – relegated
Gjerdrum – relegated

Group 5
Runar – promoted
Stovnerkameratene
ROS
Holmestrand
Slemmestad
KFUM Oslo
Slagen
Steinberg
Strømsgodset 2 – relegated
Borre – relegated
Vollen – relegated
Stokke – relegated

Group 6
Jevnaker – promoted
Liv/Fossekallen
Larvik Turn
Tønsberg FK
Mjøndalen 2
Teie
Drafn
Snøgg
Skotfoss
Birkebeineren – relegated
Flint – relegated
Rjukan – relegated

Group 7
Flekkefjord – promoted
Kvinesdal
Vigør
Vindbjart
Gulset
Urædd
Grane
Sørfjell
Tollnes
Langesund
Store Bergan – relegated
Lyngdal – relegated – relegated

Group 8
Egersund – promoted
Figgjo
Randaberg
Eiger
Staal
Sola
Hana
Bjerkreim
Sunde
Ganddal – relegated
Stavanger – relegated
Buøy – relegated

Group 9
Vedavåg – promoted
Nord
Åkra
Kopervik
Skjold
Bjørnar
Solid
Trio
Varhaug
Madla – relegated
Eidsvåg – relegated
Odda – relegated

Group 10
Florvåg – promoted
Radøy
Voss
Follese
Bergen Nord
Hardy
Telavåg
Øygard
Nest
Bjarg – relegated
Ask – relegated
Minde – relegated

Group 11
Sogndal 2 – promoted
Stryn
Florø
Fjøra
Høyang
Sandane
Jotun
Førde
Eid
Vikane
Kaupanger – relegated
Vik – relegated

Group 12
Ørsta – promoted
Langevåg
Valder
Brattvåg
Stordal
Sykkylven
Åram
Skodje
Spjelkavik – relegated
Bergsøy – relegated
Herd – relegated
Vigra – relegated

Group 13
Sunndal – promoted
Molde 2
Clausenengen
Isfjorden
Rival
Træff
Kvass
Tomrefjord
Bryn
Bud – relegated
Goma – relegated
Fræna/Elnesvågen – relegated

Group 14
Kolstad – promoted
Orkanger
Ørland
Freidig
NTHI
HIL/Fevåg
Nationalkameratene
Rissa
Tynset
Flå – relegated
Oppdal – relegated
Nidelv – relegated

Group 15
Nessegutten – promoted
Sparbu
Verdal
Fram
Sverre
Ranheim
Vinne
Vanvik
Skogn
Bangsund – relegated
Varden – relegated
Neset – relegated

Group 16
Fauske/Sprint – promoted
Mo/Bossmo
Mosjøen
Saltdalkameratene
Olderskog
Sørfold
Grand Bodø
Korgen
Halsakameratene
Brønnøysund
Innstranden – relegated
Ørnes – relegated

Group 17
Harstad – promoted
Svolvær (-> FK Lofoten)
Vågakameratene
Landsås
Andenes
Morild
Kabelvåg
Ajaks
Stokmarknes
Luna
Hardhaus – relegated
Melbo – relegated

Group 18
Tromsø 2 – promoted
Finnsnes
Skjervøy
Silsand
Salangen
Ramfjord
Fløya
Kvaløysletta
Kåfjord
Ullsfjord
Nordkjosbotn – relegated
Bardu – relegated

Group 19
Polarstjernen – promoted
Vardø
Kautokeino
Norild
Lakselv
Nordkyn (-> FK Nordkinn)
Bjørnevatn
HIF/Stein
Porsanger – relegated
Bølgen
Tverrelvdalen
Rafsbotn – relegated

References

Norwegian Third Division seasons
4
Norway
Norway